L-cysteine:1D-myo-inositol 2-amino-2-deoxy-alpha-D-glucopyranoside ligase (MshC, MshC ligase, Cys:GlcN-Ins ligase, mycothiol ligase) is an enzyme with systematic name L-cysteine:1-O-(2-amino-2-deoxy-alpha-D-glucopyranosyl)-1D-myo-inositol ligase (AMP-forming). This enzyme catalyses the following chemical reaction

 1-O-(2-amino-2-deoxy-alpha-D-glucopyranosyl)-1D-myo-inositol + L-cysteine + ATP  1-O-[2-(L-cysteinamido)-2-deoxy-alpha-D-glucopyranosyl]-1D-myo-inositol + AMP + diphosphate

This enzyme is a key enzyme in the biosynthesis of mycothiol.

References

External links 
 

EC 6.3.1